Choi Won-Woo (born 13 October 1988) is a South Korea football midfielder, who formerly played for Gyeongnam FC and Gwangju Sangmu in K-League.

His father, Choi Soon-Ho, is the former footballer who represented South Korea in 94 matches, scoring 30 goals.

Club career statistics

External links 
 K-League Player Record 

1988 births
Living people
Association football midfielders
South Korean footballers
Gyeongnam FC players
Gimcheon Sangmu FC players
K League 1 players
Korea National League players